Valle Soprana is a small village in the province of Teramo, in the Abruzzo region of central Italy. It is a frazione of the town of Teramo.

Geography
Valle Soprana lies about six miles from Teramo, near the edge of the Gran Sasso National Park.  Leading up to the ridge of f the Asino Hills, the countryside surrounding Valle Soprana is characterized by a series of trails (tratturi) that in the past were used by shepherds in their yearly migration of sheep (transhumance) from the Abruzzo to the Apulia and Lazio regions of Italy.

Valle Soprana sits on the banks of a stream called the Fiumiciello, a small tributary of the Tordino river.  The provincial road SP47, which runs from Frondarola to Pagliaroli, transverses the town.

History
The village is known as the home of the Aceti family who have lived in the area for centuries and for many years owned and operated a small pharmacy in nearby Valle San Giovanni.

References

External links
Valle Soprana Village Website

Frazioni of the Province of Teramo
Teramo